Novo Progresso is a municipality in the state of Pará in the Northern region of Brazil.

The city is served by Novo Progresso Airport

The municipality contains part of the  Nascentes da Serra do Cachimbo Biological Reserve, a strictly protected conservation unit established in 2005.
It also contains part of the  Rio Novo National Park, a conservation unit created in 2006.
In contains the  Jamanxim National Forest, a sustainable use conservation unit created in 2006 in which uncontrolled clearance of the Amazon rainforest was proceeding at a rapid pace.

Climate

See also
List of municipalities in Pará

References

Municipalities in Pará